Thomas Franklin Sibly K.B.E. (25 October 1883 – 13 April 1948) was a British geologist who had a distinguished career in University administration, being first Principal of University College, Swansea (1920), and later Vice-Chancellor of the University of Wales, Principal of the University of London and from 1929 to 1946 Vice-Chancellor of the University of Reading.

References

External links
Sir Thomas Franklin Sibly (1883–1948) by William D. Dring - Art UK Your Paintings.

1883 births
1948 deaths
Academics of the University of London
Academics of the University of Reading
Academics of the University of Wales
20th-century British geologists
Members of the Order of the British Empire
Vice-Chancellors of the University of Reading
Vice-Chancellors of the University of Wales